Hasora khoda, the large banded awl, is a butterfly belonging to the family Hesperiidae which is found in India, parts of Southeast Asia and Australia.

Range 
The large banded awl is found in India in Assam (Cachar) and the Andaman islands eastwards to Myanmar, Thailand, the Philippines, Sulawesi, New Caledonia and Australia.

The type locality is New Caledonia.

Status 
Very rare.

Host-plants 
The larva has been recorded on Callerya megasperma and Wisteria sinensis.

See also 
 Coeliadinae
 Hesperiidae
 List of butterflies of India (Coeliadinae)
 List of butterflies of India (Hesperiidae)

References 

Print
 
Online
 
 Brower, Andrew V. Z., (2007). Hasora Moore 1881. Version 21 February 2007 (under construction). Page on genus Hasora in The Tree of Life Web Project http://tolweb.org/.
 

Hasora
Butterflies of Asia
Butterflies described in 1876
Taxa named by Paul Mabille